Transmembrane and immunoglobulin domain containing 2 is a protein that in humans is encoded by the TMIGD2 gene. TMIGD2 was discovered by Nader Rahimi.

References 

Human proteins